"Heat of the Moment" is a song performed by After 7, issued as the lead single from the group's eponymous debut album in 1989. While reaching number 5 on the Billboard R&B chart, it stalled at number 74 on the Billboard Hot 100. It reentered the Hot 100 in late 1990, peaking at No. 19 on the Billboard Hot 100 in early 1991.

Charts

Weekly charts

Year-end charts

References

External links
 Hot 100 chart run After 7 Heat Of The Moment, Record and Charts Professional.

1989 songs
1989 debut singles
After 7 songs
Songs written by Babyface (musician)
Songs written by L.A. Reid
Song recordings produced by Babyface (musician)
Song recordings produced by L.A. Reid
Virgin Records singles